Easy Money is a 1948 British satirical film about a modern British tradition, the football pools. It is composed of four tales about the effect a major win has in four different situations in the post-war period. Written by Muriel and Sydney Box, based on the play "Easy Money" written by Arnold Ridley, and directed by Bernard Knowles, it was released by Gainsborough Pictures.

Plot

In the first story, a comedy, a content suburban family, headed by Jack Warner, is turned into an unhappy lot by their various reactions to a win on the football pools. When matters reach a point where they begin wishing that they had never won the money, the youngest daughter (Petula Clark) announces that in fact she forgot to post their entry, and they all regain their previously happy lives. But then it is discovered that it was a previous entry she had forgotten to post and the winning coupon was mailed, and they decide that they have learned a lesson and resolve not to let the money ruin their happiness.

In the second, a mild-mannered clerk (Mervyn Johns) with a domineering wife wins a large amount but becomes concerned when his wife insists he quit his mundane job. He finds the prospect of having to tell his employer that he is resigning too daunting, so he plots with a friend that he will fake illness as a way of leaving, but the deceit proves so taxing that he suffers a heart attack.

The third is a crime caper involving a part-time coupon checker (Dennis Price) and his nightclub singer girlfriend (Greta Gynt) who devise a scheme to embezzle the winning pot.

The final episode, another comedy, concerns a disillusioned double-bass player (Edward Rigby) who after a large win on the pools discovers he misses his friends in the orchestra he left, so he becomes its benefactor, subject to the condition that the double-bass section is given unusual prominence in the orchestral lineup.

Cast
 Greta Gynt as Pat Parsons 
 Dennis Price as Joe Henty 
 Jack Warner as Philip Stafford 
 Mervyn Johns as Herbert Atkins
 Marjorie Fielding as Ruth Stafford 
 Yvonne Owen as Carol Stafford 
 Jack Watling as Dennis Stafford 
 Petula Clark as Jackie Stafford 
 Mabel Constanduros as Grandma Stafford
 David Tomlinson as Martin Latham 
 Maurice Denham as Detective-Inspector Kirby 
 Joan Young as Agnes Watkins 
 Gordon McLeod as Cameron 
 Grey Blake as Wilson
 Ernest Butcher as Clerk
 Bill Owen as Mr Lee
 Hugh Pryse as Martin
 Jack Raine as Managing Director 
 Richard Molinas as Johnny 
 Edward Rigby as Edward "Teddy" Ball
 Guy Rolfe as Archie 
 Raymond Lovell as Mr Cyprus 
 Frank Cellier as Director of Orchestra
 John Blythe as Waiter

Reception
Critics at the time noted the film was faintly reminiscent of the all-star 1932 Hollywood release If I Had a Million. It earned mixed reviews, but proved to be popular with audiences – still reeling from the effects of World War II – seeking lighthearted entertainment.

The film earned a profit of £2,200.

References

Gainsborough Melodrama, edited by Sue Aspinall and Robert Murphy, published by the British Film Institute, London, 1983

External links

 

1948 films
British black-and-white films
British crime comedy films
Gainsborough Pictures films
Films directed by Bernard Knowles
1940s crime comedy films
Films with screenplays by Muriel Box
Films with screenplays by Sydney Box
British anthology films
1940s satirical films
1948 comedy films
1940s English-language films
1940s British films